Bîcioc (Bychok, Bychok) is a commune in the Grigoriopol District of Transnistria, Moldova. It is composed of two villages, Bîcioc and Novovladimirovca (Нововладимировка). It is currently under the administration of the breakaway government of the Transnistrian Moldovan Republic.

References

Communes of Transnistria